Juvtinden is a mountain in Nathorst Land at Spitsbergen, Svalbard. It has a height of 1,138 m.a.s.l. The mountain is surrounded by the glaciers of Snøkuvbreen, Steindolpbreen, Lundbreen and Juvbreen. A nearby mountain of Juvtinden is Steindolptoppen.

References

Mountains of Spitsbergen